The Holopaw State Forest is in the U.S. state of Florida. The 58-acre (0.23 km2) forest is located off U.S. Route 192 in Central Florida, within the unincorporated town of Holopaw, Florida in Osceola County, Florida. 

The forest is located south of the "Indian Branch" of Crabgrass Creek, a tributary of the Upper Basin of the St. Johns River. Due to its small size, access to the forest is only available through a permit issued by the Division of Forestry's field office in Orlando.

See also
List of Florida state forests
List of Florida state parks

References

External links

 Holopaw State Forest: Florida Division of Forestry - FDACS

Florida state forests
Protected areas of Osceola County, Florida